Randy Paul Romero  (December 22, 1957 – August 29, 2019) was a Hall of Fame jockey in the sport of  Thoroughbred horse racing.

Born into a family involved with horses, his father Lloyd J. Romero was a Louisiana state trooper who trained American Quarter Horses and later, after a drunk driver crashed into his police car and permanently disabled him, he began training Thoroughbreds for flat racing. The 1978 movie Casey's Shadow is based on Lloyd Romero and his family. He was elected into the Thoroughbred Racing Hall of Fame May 27, 2010.

Career
In 1975, Romero began his professional riding career at Evangeline Downs in Lafayette, Louisiana.

Nicknamed the "Ragin' Cajun", in 1983 at Oaklawn Park racetrack in Arkansas Romero suffered a near career-ending injury when he received major burns to two-thirds of his body from a freak fire that erupted while taking a sauna. He had rubbed himself down with alcohol and moved into the sauna in the jockey's room. As he did he accidentally broke a live light bulb that immediately ignited his entire body. After seven months of rehabilitation, he returned to compete at the Fair Grounds Race Course in New Orleans, where he won his third of four riding titles and set a track record with 181 wins.

Romero's success led to owner Ogden Phipps and trainer Shug McGaughey choosing him to be the regular rider for Personal Ensign. Romero rode the future Hall of Fame filly to an undefeated career, capped off with a victory in the 1988 Breeders' Cup Distaff, an event he had won the previous year aboard Sacahuista for trainer D. Wayne Lukas. The following year he won his third straight Breeders' Cup race, taking the Juvenile Fillies event with Go for Wand. He was aboard Go for Wand and in the lead when she broke down in the 1990 Breeders' Cup Distaff race. Romero broke his pelvis and several ribs, and the filly had to be euthanized.
 
While Romero met with great success as a jockey, the downside of his career was a number of racing-related injuries requiring more than twenty surgeries. He retired in July 1999 having ridden 4,285 winners, notably winning a number of important Grade I events.

Health problems
In 2002, Romero's health problems were added to when he learned that the disordered eating required to maintain riding weight during his years as a jockey had severely damaged his kidneys. He said he began vomiting his food at an early age in the practice known as "flipping" in the world of jockeys.

In addition, his liver was damaged by a tainted blood transfusion received during one of his many operations. Along with fellow jockey Shane Sellers, he was featured in the 2004 HBO documentary film titled Jockey. Directed by Kate Davis, the films tells the story of their health problems resulting from racing injuries and the long-term effects of bulimia to maintain racing weight.

For a number of years, Romero suffered from hepatitis C and on February 18, 2008 he had a kidney removed at a Louisville, Kentucky hospital. His remaining kidney did not work very well and he had to receive dialysis treatments several times each week.

On June 19, 2019, Romero entered  hospice care in Lafayette due to his cancer which was detected in 2015.

Romero died on August 29, 2019, due to stomach cancer.

Legacy
Romero was voted into the National Museum of Racing and Hall of Fame in 2010.

References

External links
 Cincinnati Enquirer, "Horse racing's dirty little secret"
 Boston University, WBUR Public Radio story on Randy Romero
 NTRA Bio Randy Romero

1957 births
2019 deaths
People from Erath, Louisiana
Cajun jockeys
American jockeys
United States Thoroughbred Racing Hall of Fame inductees
Deaths from stomach cancer
Deaths from cancer in the United States